The Hispanic Heritage Baseball Museum was founded in San Francisco, California on October 24, 1998, by Amaury Pi-Gonzalez.

Members of Hall of Fame

Juan Marichal, 2003
Tony Taylor, 2004
Roberto Clemente, 2010

References

External links 
 The Hispanic Heritage Baseball Museum Hall of Fame
 Article about its founding

Baseball museums and halls of fame
Hispanic and Latino American culture in San Francisco
Sports museums in California
Latino museums in the United States
Ethnic museums in California
Museums in San Francisco
Museums established in 1999
1999 establishments in California
Hispanic and Latino American culture in California